Iglesia de San Juan Bautista may refer to:

in Spain
 Iglesia de San Juan Bautista (Arganda del Rey)
 Iglesia de San Juan Bautista (Chiclana de la Frontera), Andalusia, Spain
 Iglesia de San Juan Bautista (Jodra del Pinar)
 Iglesia de San Juan Bautista (San Tirso de Abres), Asturias, Spain
 Iglesia de San Juan Bautista (Talamanca de Jarama)
 Iglesia de San Juan Bautista (Vélez-Málaga)
 Iglesia de San Juan Bautista, Baños de Cerrato

in Puerto Rico, U.S. territory
 Iglesia de San Juan Bautista (Maricao, Puerto Rico), Maricao, Puerto Rico